Gülnar Hatun (aka Büyük Ece, 731-769) was a semi legendary Turkish female hero. (Hatun is actually a title meaning "lady".) Her life story requires further research.

Life
She was born in 731 to Yahşi and his wife Duru. According to unsourced claims the family descended from a branch of Göktürk family. Her family was in the Dörtkuyu village close to Merv, what is now in Turkmenistan. Merv was under  Umayyad rule and the Turks in Merv were fighting against forced proselytising. Both Gülnar's  and her fiancé Yirbağı's fathers were killed by Umayyad general Nasr ibn Sayyar during the reign of  Caliph Marwan II. Although Umayyads were replaced by the Abbasids in 750, during the early years of the Abbasid rule Abbasid policy was not much different than that of the Umayyad. After Yırbağı was also killed,  Gülnar with a large partisan group escaped to Al-'Awasim, a buffer region between the Abbasid and the Byzantine Empires, what is now in south Turkey. In al Awasim,  Gülnar began fighting against Abbasids and in 769 she too was killed during a clash around Gülek Pass (Cicilian Gates of the antiquity).

Legacy
In 1950 the Turkmen town Hanaypazar in Mersin Province  was renamed Gülnar. Now Gülnar is a district center. According to one view the town (now neighborhood of Gülnar) Büyükeceli was also named after Gülnar Hatun (also known as Büyük Ece).

References

731 births
769 deaths
Gülnar District
Turkish women
Women in medieval European warfare
Women in war in the Middle East